Les Grandes Misères de la guerre (English: The Great Miseries of War or The Miseries and Misfortunes of War) are a series of 18 etchings by French artist Jacques Callot (1592–1635), titled in full Les Misères et les Malheurs de la Guerre.  Despite the grand theme of the series, the images are in fact only about 83 mm × 180 mm (3.25 x 7 inches) each, and are called the "large" Miseries to distinguish them from an even smaller earlier set on the same subject.

The series was published in 1633, is Callot's best-known work, and has been called the first "anti-war statement" in European art. 
The images are panoramic views with many small figures, and they feature gradation from light to dark that was typical of Callot's etchings. 
In sequence, the images recount the story of soldiers as they enroll in an army, fight in a battle, and rampage through the civilian community, only to then be arrested and executed.
The etchings can also be considered as an early prototypical French comic strip, within the text comics genre, since the illustrations are accompanied by a descriptive text beneath the images.

Description

Les Grandes Misères depict the destruction unleashed on civilians during the Thirty Years' War; no specific campaign is depicted, but the set inevitably recalls the actions of the army that Cardinal Richelieu sent in 1633 to occupy Callot's native Lorraine before annexing it to France. Callot was living in the capital, Nancy, at the time, though the prints were published, like most of his work, in Paris, with the necessary royal licence. The plates still exist, in a museum in Nancy, as do seven drawings of whole compositions, and many tiny studies for figures, with a large group in the Hermitage Museum.

The series begins with a florid title page, followed by an enrollment parade and a battle scene. Plates 4–8 show bands of the victorious soldiers successively attacking a farm, convent, and coach, and burning a village. In plates 9–14 they are rounded up and subjected to various methods of public torture and execution. Plate 15 shows crippled soldiers in a grand neo-classical hospital, Plate 16 unemployed soldiers dying in the street, and Plate 17 the peasants taking revenge on a group they have captured, killing them with flails. Plate 18 shows an enthroned king distributing rewards to the victorious generals. 

Each print has a six-line verse caption below the image, written by the famous print-collector Michel de Marolles. All show wide panoramic views, with many tiny figures, as is typical of Callot's work. The technique of using multiple bitings of acid on the plate, with different areas "stopped-out", was perfected by Callot. This method allows gradations in the strength of the line, with distant parts of the scene usually lighter.

Legacy
The central image in what might be the first editorial cartoon is a parody of La Pendaison. In William Hogarth's early engraving Emblematical Print on the South Sea Scheme, the hanging tree is replaced by a wheel of fortune. Francisco Goya probably owned a set of Callot's etchings, and they are believed to have influenced his similar series, Los Desastres de la guerra (The Disasters of War), almost two centuries later.

Gallery

References

Bibliography
 DP Becker in KL Spangeberg (ed), Six Centuries of Master Prints, Cincinnati Art Museum, 1993. 
 Fatal Consequences: Callot, Goya, and the Horrors of War, Hood Museum of Art, Dartmouth, 1990. 
 Ann Sutherland Harris, Seventeenth-century art & architecture, Laurence King Publishing, 2005.

External links

Zoomable image of The Hanging at Christies

17th-century etchings
War art
War comics
1633 works
Text comics
Anti-war works
Anti-war comics
Comics set in the 17th century
Thirty Years' War in popular culture